The Society of North Carolina Archivists (SNCA) is a tax-exempt, nonprofit organization established in 1984 to promote cooperation and the exchange of information among individuals and institutions interested in the preservation and use of the archival and manuscript resources of North Carolina.

Membership

Members include professional archivists, librarians who bear responsibility for historical records, and other persons involved in the care of manuscripts. Through the Society, members are able to share information on archival methodology and the availability of research materials and discuss matters of common concern as they pertain to the archival profession in North Carolina.

Meetings

SNCA's annual conference, held each March, includes lectures, seminars, panel discussions, workshops, and facility tours which provide both beginner and veteran archivists the opportunity to increase their knowledge of archival trends, methods, and skills. Conference locations rotate between the western, central, and eastern part of the state.

Publications

 The North Carolina Archivist newsletter
 Journal for the Society of North Carolina Archivists

Awards & Development

 Thornton W. Mitchell Service Award
 Gene J. Williams Student Paper Award
 C. David Jackson Meeting Scholarship
 Grants to Student Societies
 Michelle Francis Endowment Fund

External links
 Official site

Library associations in the United States
Archivist associations
History organizations based in the United States